Visoka Polyana is a village in the Kardzhali Municipality, which is in the Kardzhali Province, in southern Bulgaria. As of 1 January 2007, the population of Visoka Polyana is 224 people.

References

Villages in Kardzhali Province
Kardzhali Province